Krishnadevipeta popularly known by its abbreviated form K.D.Peta, is a village in Golugonda mandal of Anakapalli district in the state of Andhra Pradesh, India. It lies 111 km west of Visakhapatnam city. This village is known for the location of tomb of freedom fighter Alluri Sitarama Raju.

Location and Geography 

Krishnadevipeta is located 111 km west of Visakhapatnam city. It is 28 km away from Narsipatnam.

References 

Villages in Anakapalli district